3 Days in Quiberon is a 2018 drama film directed by Emily Atef. It was selected to compete for the Golden Bear in the main competition section at the 68th Berlin International Film Festival.

Plot
In 1981 at a spa in Quiberon, the celebrated actress Romy Schneider is undergoing a cure. Ignoring the strict regime, she largely exists on tobacco, alcohol, and tranquillisers. Hilde, an old friend from Vienna, comes to spend a couple of days with her and she is also visited by another old friend, the photographer Robert Lebeck. He brings a journalist, to whom Romy has agreed to give an in-depth interview for the German magazine Stern.

Michael does not attempt to ingratiate himself or first win her confidence but in a clinical way probes with continually penetrating questions. Their sessions take on the air of a Catholic confessional or a psychiatrist's consulting room, for Romy seems ready to be open and to put on record much about of her life. Indeed, both Hilde and Robert at different times try to protect her from going too far.

Romy says her main worry is the constant pressure of film work and her resulting absence from the lives of her children. After the interviews are over, she dances for joy on the rocks and breaks her ankle. Unable to work, she is confined to her Paris flat with her little daughter when Robert brings the proofs of the interview for her to approve. She makes virtually no changes, accepting that Michael had captured a true picture of her.

Cast
 Marie Bäumer as Romy Schneider
 Birgit Minichmayr as Hilde Fritsch
 Charly Hübner as Robert Lebeck
 Robert Gwisdek as Michael Jürgs

References

External links
 
 
 

2018 films
2018 drama films
2018 biographical drama films
2010s German-language films
German biographical drama films
Biographical films about actors
Films about journalists
Films set in 1981
2010s German films
Romy Schneider